WAEZ (94.9 FM) is a United States Mainstream Top 40 radio station serving the Tri-Cities TN-VA Metropolitan Statistical Area with an ERP of 100,000 watts. It is licensed to Greeneville, Tennessee. The station started out as a Top 40 station until 2004, when the station went with a Hot AC format, but due to lower ratings, the station reverted to the Top 40 format in early 2006. WAEZ is owned by Bristol Broadcasting Company, along with "twin stations" WVSR-FM (Electric 102.7) in Charleston, West Virginia, and WDDJ-FM (Electric 96.9) in Paducah, Kentucky. The station targets active young adult females ages 18 to 34, according to Bristol Broadcasting.

Electric 94.9 is one of the most popular stations in the Tri-Cities and currently ranks fourth in the Arbitron ratings for the Tri-Cities market.

In 2011, Bristol Broadcasting purchased a translator (W237DV) and it currently re-broadcasts WAEZ on 95.3 in Kingsport, Tennessee. Previously, WAEZ dealt with many (terrain) issues getting the main signal into parts of Kingsport.

The station also has to deal with tremendous co-channel interference in and around Marion, Virginia from WSLC-FM in Roanoke.

Programming

Monday-Friday
"Electric 94.9" overnights (12 a.m. - 5 a.m.)
"Izzy" mornings (5 a.m. - 10 a.m.)
"Jessica Gamble" mid-days (10 a.m. - 3 p.m.)
"Jason Reed" afternoons (3 p.m. - 7 p.m.)
"Logan" evenings (7 p.m. - 12 a.m.)

Weekends
AT40 (Saturdays 6 a.m. - 10 a.m.)
Club Electric (Saturdays 9 p.m. - Sundays 5 a.m.)
Son Rise (Sundays 9 a.m. - 11 a.m.)
AT40 (Sundays 8 p.m. - 12 a.m.)

History
Until August 2000, WAEZ was located on 99.3 as "Electric 99-3".
From 1985 until 1993, the WAEZ callsign was formerly in Milton, West Virginia located on 106.3 FM. That station is now WAMX.
The 94.9 frequency was a country station known as "Big Dog Country" with WIKQ as their call letters up until 2000 when Bristol bought the frequency. The WIKQ call letters are now on the 103.1 FM frequency.
In the early 1970s, the 94.9 frequency carried the call letters WOFM. The station broadcast a country music format.
In the mid-1960s, WAEZ, coincidentally also on 94.9, was owned by and named for Arthur E. Zucker in Miami Beach, Florida. WAEZ was an easy listening station playing the likes of the Ray Conniff Singers, Percy Faith and Big Band music with no more than four vocals per hour.  The entire station was located in the lower lobby of the Deauville Hotel at 6701 Collins Avenue with the transmitting antenna on the roof. Zucker negotiated free rent for the station in return for frequent mention of the hotel name during weather forecasts.  An announcer might say, "The temperature in Miami is 88 degrees.  Here at the beautiful Deauville Hotel on Miami Beach, it's 85". The hotel still exists and hosts the annual New Art Dealer's Association (NADA) art festival.

External links
 Official Electric 94.9 Site

Tri-Cities Radio Market @ Bristol Broadcasting.com

AEZ
Contemporary hit radio stations in the United States